Messerschmitt AG was a German share-ownership limited, aircraft manufacturing corporation named after its chief designer Willy Messerschmitt from mid-July 1938 onwards, and known primarily for its World War II fighter aircraft, in particular the Bf 109 and Me 262. The company survived in the post-war era, undergoing a number of mergers and changing its name from Messerschmitt to Messerschmitt-Bölkow-Blohm before being bought by Deutsche Aerospace (DASA, now part of Airbus) in 1989.

History

Background
In February 1916, the south German engineering company MAN AG and several banks purchased the unprofitable aircraft builder Otto-Flugzeugwerke, starting a new company, Bayerische Flugzeugwerke AG (abbreviated B.F.W.). The articles of association were drawn up on 19 and 20 February, and completed on 2 March 1916. Details of the company were recorded in the Commercial Register with an equity capital of RM 1,000,000 on 7 March 1916. 36% of the capital was provided by the Bank für Handel und Industrie, Berlin, 30% by MAN AG and 34% by Hermann Bachstein, Berlin. The first Chairman of the Board of Management was Peter Eberwein, who had previously been employed at Albatros Flugzeugwerke.

Due to the need for immediate aircraft production for the ongoing war, there was no time for development work and BFW manufactured aircraft under licence from Albatros Flugzeugwerke. Within a month of being set up, the company was able to supply aircraft to the war ministries of Prussia and Bavaria. However, major quality problems were encountered at the start. The German air crews frequently complained about the serious defects that appeared in the first machines from BFW. The same thing had happened with the aircraft from the predecessor company run by Gustav Otto. It was only organizational changes and more intensive supervision of the assembly line that succeeded in resolving these problems by the end of 1916. BFW then started turning out over 200 aircraft a month, with their workforce growing to 3,000 and becoming one of the largest aircraft manufacturers in Bavaria.

The end of the war hit BFW hard, since military demand for aircraft collapsed. The company's management were forced to look for new products with which to maintain their position in the market. Since World War I aircraft were largely built from wood to keep their weight down, BFW was equipped with the very latest joinery plant. The company still held stocks of materials sufficient for about 200 aircraft, and worth 4.7 million reichsmarks. The machinery and the materials were then used for the production of furniture and fitted kitchens. In addition, from 1921 onwards, the company manufactured motorcycles of its own design under the names of Flink and Helios.

In the autumn of 1921, Austrian financier Camillo Castiglioni first announced his interest in purchasing BFW. While most of the shareholders accepted his offer, MAN AG initially held on to its shareholding in BFW, but Castiglioni wanted to acquire all the shares. He was supported in this by BMW's Managing Director Franz Josef Popp who, in a letter to the chairman of MAN, described BFW as a "dead factory, which possesses no plant worth mentioning, and consists very largely of dilapidated and unsuitable wooden sheds situated in a town that is extremely unfavorable for industrial activities and whose status continues to give little cause for enthusiasm". Apparently Popp was still in close contact with Castiglioni and was perhaps even privy to the latter's plans for merging BMW with BFW. It was probably in the spring of 1922 that Castiglioni and Popp persuaded MAN to give up its shares in BFW, so that now the company belonged exclusively to Castiglioni. Then, in May of the same year, when the Italian-born investor was able to acquire BMW's engine business from Knorr-Bremse AG, nothing more stood in the way of a merger between the aircraft company BFW and the engine builders BMW.

Reestablishment
Bayerische Flugzeugwerke (BFW) (Bavarian Aircraft Works) was reformed in 1926, in Augsburg, Bavaria, when Udet Flugzeugbau GmbH was changed into a joint-stock company. In the early stages, BMW AG held a stake in this company and was represented by Josef Popp, who held a place on the Supervisory Board.

Willy Messerschmitt joined the company in 1927 as chief designer and engineer and formed a design team.

One of the first designs, the Messerschmitt M20, was a near-catastrophe for the designer and the company. Many of the prototypes crashed, one of them killing Hans Hackmack, a close friend of Erhard Milch, the head of Deutsche Luft Hansa and the German civil aviation authorities. Milch was upset by the lack of response from Messerschmitt and this led to a lifelong hatred towards him. Milch eventually cancelled all contracts with Messerschmitt and forced BFW into bankruptcy in 1931. However, Messerschmitt's friendship with Hugo Junkers prevented a stagnation of the careers of him and BFW, which was started again in 1933. Milch still prevented Messerschmitt's takeover of the BFW until 1938, hence the designation "Bf" of early Messerschmitt designs.

Messerschmitt promoted a concept he called "light weight construction" in which many typically separate load-bearing parts were merged into a single reinforced firewall, thereby saving weight and improving performance. The first true test of the concept was in the Bf 108 Taifun sports aircraft, which would soon be setting all sorts of records. Based on this performance the company was invited to submit a design for the Luftwaffe's 1935 fighter contest, winning it with the Bf 109, based on the same construction methods.

From this point on Messerschmitt became a favorite of the Nazi party, as much for his designs as his political abilities and the factory location in southern Germany away from the "clumping" of aviation firms on the northern coast. BFW was reconstituted as "Messerschmitt AG" on 11 July 1938, with Willy Messerschmitt as chairman and managing director. The renaming of BFW resulted in the company's RLM designation prefix changing from "Bf" to "Me" for all newer designs that were accepted by the RLM after the acquisition date. Existing types, such as the Bf 109 and 110, retained their earlier designation in official documents, although sometimes the newer designations were used as well, most often by subcontractors, such as Erla Maschinenwerk of Leipzig. In practice, all BFW/Messerschmitt aircraft from the Bf 108 four-seat touring monoplane, to the Bf 163 light observation aircraft (which competed unsuccessfully for the government contract won by the rival Fieseler Fi 156 design) were prefixed "Bf", all later types with "Me".

World War II

During the war Messerschmitt became a major design supplier, their Bf 109 and Bf 110 forming the vast majority of fighter strength for the first half of the war. Several other designs were also ordered, including the enormous Me 321 Gigant transport glider, and its six-engined follow on, the Me 323. However, for the second half of the war, Messerschmitt turned almost entirely to jet-powered designs, producing the world's first operational jet fighter, the Me 262 Schwalbe ("Swallow"). They also produced the DFS-designed Me 163 Komet, the first rocket-powered design to enter service. Messerschmitt relied heavily on slave labour to produce much of the parts needed for these aircraft during the second half of World War II; these parts were assembled in an enormous tunnel system in Sankt Georgen an der Gusen, Austria. Slave labour was provided by inmates of the brutal KZ Gusen I and Gusen II camps, and by inmates from nearby Mauthausen concentration camp, all located near the St. Gorgen quarries. 40,000 inmates from Spain, Italy, Poland, Slovenia, France, Russia, Hungarian Jews and twenty other nationalities were murdered during the production of these aircraft at KZ Gusen. Messerschmitt officials maintained barracks at the concentration camp to oversee the work being done by the inmates. Messerschmitt, and its executive Willy Messerschmitt also occupied the famed Villa Tugendhat in Brno, Czech Republic, designed by Mies van der Rohe and Lilly Reich in the 1920s; the Messerschmitt aircraft factory office and the Gestapo occupied the property during the war.

Messerschmitt had its share of poor designs as well; the Me 210, designed as a follow-on to the 110, was an aerodynamic disaster that almost led to the forced dissolution of the company. The design problems were eventually addressed in the Me 410 Hornisse, but only small numbers were built before all attention turned to the 262. Later in the war, in competition with the Junkers Ju 390 and the unbuilt, February 1943-initiated Heinkel He 277, Messerschmitt also worked on a heavy Amerika Bomber design, the Me 264, which flew in prototype form — with three prototype airframes built, the first of which flew in December 1942 — but was too late to see combat.

Post-war
For ten years after World War II, the company was not allowed to produce aircraft. One alternative the company came up with was the three-wheeled motorcycle/bubble car or Kabinenroller (cabinscooter) KR175 / KR200, designed by an aircraft engineer, Fritz Fend.

The cars were actually made by Fend's own company in the Messerschmitt works at Regensburg, and Willy Messerschmitt had very little to do with the vehicles other than ruling that they carried his name. Production of the KR200 ceased in 1964.

The Messerschmitt factory also produced prefabricated houses, which were designed as "self-building-kits" mainly based on an alloy framework.

Return to aviation
On 6 June 1968, Messerschmitt AG merged with the small civil engineering and civil aviation firm Bölkow, becoming Messerschmitt-Bölkow. The following May, the firm acquired Hamburger Flugzeugbau (HFB). The company then changed its name to Messerschmitt-Bölkow-Blohm (MBB). In 1989 MBB was taken over by DASA. DASA later operated as "EADS Germany", which is now Airbus.

Aircraft

Other types of aircraft
 Messerschmitt Me 109TL

Missiles
Enzian

See also
 List of RLM aircraft designations
 Messerschmitt-Bölkow-Blohm

References

External links

 
Defunct aircraft manufacturers of Germany
Defunct motor vehicle manufacturers of Germany
Companies based in Augsburg
Companies involved in the Holocaust